St. Mark's Episcopal Church is located in the Crescent Hill historic district, on Frankfort Avenue which was begun as Louisville and Lexington turnpike in the 1850s. The church is located at the corner of Frankfort and Kennedy Avenues in Louisville, Kentucky. 
The church was founded as a missionary parish in 1891. The parish purchased the lot upon which the church was built in 1895. The first service was held in the new church on June 12, 1895.

Today the church is active member parish of the  Episcopal Diocese of Kentucky.

External links
St. Mark's Episcopal Church 
 History St. Mark's Episcopal Church

19th-century buildings and structures in Louisville, Kentucky
Churches in Louisville, Kentucky
Episcopal church buildings in Kentucky
19th-century Episcopal church buildings
Religious organizations established in 1891
Churches completed in 1895